Gothra Tappa Dahina is a village in Jatusana Tehsil, Rewari District, Haryana, India, in Gurgaon Division. Its pin code is 123411 and its postal head office is at Dahina.

Local crops include maize, wheat, and millet.

Demographics
As of the 2011 India census, Gothra Tappa Dahina had a population of 2886 in 578 households. Males (1551) constituted 52.57%  of the population and females (1399) 47.42%. Gothra Tappa Dahina had an average literacy (2015) rate of 68.3%, lower than the national average of 74%: male literacy (1185) was 58.8%, and female literacy (830) was 41.19% of total literates (2015). 13.22% of the population were under 6 years of age (390).

In 2018, health workers reported a ratio of 133 men to every 100 women.

Adjacent villages
Kanwali
Dhani Thather Bad
Nimoth 
Siha 
Zainabad
Lisan on Kanina-Kosli road
Lohana

References 

Villages in Rewari district